Dolisie, known as Loubomo (or Lubomo) between 1975 and 1991, is a city in the western province of Niari in the Republic of the Congo. It is the country's third largest city and an important commercial centre.  The city lies on the eastern edge of the coastal rainforest and has a population of 83,798 (2007 census).

History 
The city was founded as a station on the Congo-Ocean Railway, and it was named after Pierre Savorgnan de Brazza's lieutenant Albert Dolisie.
It became a thriving city thanks to the wealth of the railway, and it had 20,000 inhabitants in 1972. The city's name changed to Loubomo in 1975, and soon it became the third largest city in Congo-Brazzaville. The civil war of the late 1990s caused an exodus of rural people toward cities, and Loubomo's population has significantly increased since then.

Economy 
Dolisie is a major rail center.  Its location marks the link between the east-west Congo-Ocean Railway and the Mbinda line which runs north to the border with Gabon at Mbinda.
Dolisie is also home to numerous small industries (wood, lumber).

Transport 
Dolise is home to Dolisie Airport.

Dolisie-Loubomo railway station on the Congo–Ocean Railway provides daily rail service to Pointe-Noire, Brazzaville and intermediate points.

International relations

Twin towns – Sister cities
Dolisie is twinned with:
 Riom, France

Climate

See also
Railway stations in Congo
Transport in the Republic of the Congo

References 

 Decalo S., Thompson V. & Adloff R. 1984. Historical dictionary of Congo Pg 180. USA: The Scarecrow Press, Inc.

External links

Niari Department
Populated places in the Republic of the Congo
Populated places established in 1934